Days of Glory is a 2006 French film directed by Rachid Bouchareb. The cast includes Sami Bouajila, Jamel Debbouze, Samy Naceri, Roschdy Zem, Mélanie Laurent and Bernard Blancan.

The film deals with the contribution of North African soldiers to the Free French Forces during the Second World War and, controversially, with the discrimination against them. The film's release contributed to a partial recognition of the pension rights of soldiers from former French possessions by the French government.

Cast members Jamel Debbouze, Samy Naceri, Roschdy Zem, Sami Bouajila and Bernard Blancan all won the Prix d'interprétation masculine at the 2006 Cannes Film Festival for their performances, and the film won the François Chalais Prize. It was also nominated for the Academy Award for Best Foreign Language Film.

Plot
In French North Africa in 1943 large numbers of men from France's overseas possessions have been recruited into the French First Army of the Free French Forces to fight alongside the other Allies against Nazi Germany and liberate France from occupation. The army consists of two main elements: pieds-noirs, that is people of mostly European descent, and indigènes, those of mostly African descent. The "indigènes" in turn consist of three main groups: Algerians, Moroccans (known as goumiers), and troops from Sub-Sahara Africa.

Saïd, an impoverished goat herder, joins the 7th RTA (Régiment de Tirailleurs Algériens). With him are other Algerians including Messaoud, who wants to marry and settle in France, and the literate Corporal Abdelkader, who seeks equality with settlers for the indigenous people of his country. There are also two Moroccan brothers Yassir and Larbi, Yassir's aim being booty so that Larbi can afford to marry. 
 
Soon the men, dressed in mostly lend-lease American uniforms meet Sergeant Martinez, a battle-hardened pied-noir, who trains them before leading them on their first engagement against the Germans in Italy. Their mission is to capture a heavily-defended mountain, but it soon becomes clear that their French commanding officer is using them as cannon fodder to identify artillery targets. The colonial troops eventually succeed, at the cost of high casualties. When asked by a French war correspondent about his thoughts on the losses, the French colonel replies, "today was a great victory for the Free French Forces".
 
The troops of the 7th RTA next embark for Operation Dragoon, to liberate the south of France. While aboard ship, a French cook refuses to give tomatoes to indigènes soldiers. Abdelkader calls for equality, but mutiny is averted when Martinez and the company captain promise that everyone will be treated the same.

On arrival at Marseille, the colonial troops are greeted as heroes. Messaoud meets and courts Irène, a French woman, promising when the regiment leaves that he will write and one day return. She says she'll wait for him and they will marry. However, due to censorship of soldiers' mail, Irène never learns Messaoud's fate.

Saïd becomes Martinez's orderly, for which the other soldiers call him "girlie" and imply he's gay. Eventually he snaps and holds a knife to Messaoud's throat. Abdelkader calms the situation, but Saïd makes it clear that in this segregated world the French authorities will not give their colonial soldiers anything. Having seen among Martinez's possessions a family photograph, while drinking with the sergeant Saïd mentions that the two of them are similar in both having an Arab mother. The NCO attacks him and threatens to kill him if he reveals this secret.

The colonial troops discover that, while they are not granted leave, French members of the Free French Forces are allowed trips home. Eventually the men are told they will be going home, but it's a ruse; instead, they are billeted behind the lines and given a ballet performance. Bored and disillusioned, most leave the tent and hold a meeting outside decrying the injustice. Martinez challenges the group, led by Abdelkader, and a fight starts.

Early next morning, French military police bring Messaoud to a temporary stockade where Abdelkader is also being held. Messaoud says he was arrested for trying to go back to Marseille and find Irène. Abdelkader is brought before the French colonel who tells him that he needs him to go on a special mission: to take ammunition to American troops fighting in the Lorraine Campaign and also be the first French troops to liberate Alsace. The French officer promises that Abdelkader and the other colonial soldiers will get the rewards and recognition that success in this operation will bring. Later, the white company captain tells the corporal that the colonel will keep his word.

As they cross the German lines, most of the men are killed by a booby trap, including Yassir's brother, and Martinez is severely injured. The survivors mostly want to go back, but Abdelkader rallies them to push on. Eventually the corporal, Saïd, Messaoud, Yassir and the wounded Martinez reach an Alsatian village. Over the next few days the soldiers ingratiate themselves into the area and Saïd befriends a milkmaid. When a unit of Germans arrives into the village, a battle breaks out. Messaoud is badly hurt by a Panzerschreck rocket and then shot by a German rifleman. Saïd attempts to evacuate Martinez, but they are both shot by the Panzerschreck, killing Saïd and further wounding Martinez, who is quickly finished off. Abdelkader and Yassir attempt to flee, but Yassir is shot in the back by a German. However, just as the corporal is cornered, more colonial troops arrive and drive the Germans out of the village.

As columns of Free French forces begin to move through the area, Abdelkader sees the colonel passing in his jeep, but the French commanding officer ignores him and he is pulled away by a staff officer who asks him where his unit is. When Abdelkader says they are all dead, he is simply assigned to another French NCO. As he walks out of the village, he passes a film cameraman filming only French troops standing by the liberated villagers. The villagers, however, applaud Abdelkader as he leaves.

The movie then moves to the present day. An elderly Abdelkader goes to a war cemetery in Alsace to visit the graves of his comrades: Martinez, Larbi, Saïd, Yassir and Messaoud. He then returns to his small rundown flat in modern-day France. The film concludes with the caption that from 1959 pensions for servicemen from France's overseas possessions living in France enjoyed no increases after the date their country of origin became independent.

Cast
 Jamel Debbouze - Saïd Otmari
 Samy Naceri - Yassir
 Roschdy Zem - Messaoud Souni
 Sami Bouajila - Abdelkader
 Bernard Blancan - Sergeant Roger Martinez
 Mathieu Simonet - Caporal Leroux
 Assaad Bouab - Larbi
 Mélanie Laurent - Margueritte village Vosges
 Benoît Giros - Captain Durieux
 Thibault de Montalembert - Captain Martin
 Aurélie Eltvedt - Irène
 Dioucounda Koma - Touré 
 Philippe Beglia - Rambert
 Antoine Chappey - The colonel
 Kalen Bushe - Second colonel
 Thomas Langmann - The journalist
 Julie de Bona

Modern relevance
While each has his own motives, these native Africans have enlisted to fight for a France they have never seen. In the words of Le Chant des Africains the four actors sing within the film, "we come from the colonies to save the motherland, we come from afar to die, we are the men of Africa." The film shows a complex depiction of their treatment in an army organisation prejudiced in favour of the European French.

The discrimination by the French authorities against these soldiers continued as successive French governments froze the war pensions of these indigenous veterans when their countries became independent. The closing credits of the film state that, despite the ruling that war pensions should be paid in full, successive French administrations since 2002 had not done so. It was only after the film's release that the government policy was changed to bring foreign combatant pensions into line with what French veterans are paid. But, as of 2010, no war pension in arrears (almost 40 years) have been considered.

In 2009, the BBC published documentary evidence that showed black colonial soldiers - who together with North African troops made up around two-thirds of Free French forces - were deliberately removed from the units that led the Allied advance to liberate Paris in 1944. General Charles de Gaulle made it clear that he wanted Free French troops to enter the French capital first. In response Allied Command therefore insisted that all black soldiers should be replaced by European and North African ones from other French units.

As historian Julian Jackson elaborated, "Once Vichyite Algeria had been conquered by the Allies, de Gaulle was finally allowed to go there, in May 1943. Now Algiers replaced London and Brazzaville as the capital of the Free French. Even more important was the fact that Algeria contained an important reservoir of North African troops. At the end of 1942 de Gaulle's total forces never numbered more than 50,000, but now, in 1943, thanks to Algeria, he had an army of about half a million men. This multi-racial army was first thrown into battle in Italy in 1943 - it fought at the Battle of Monte Cassino - then landed with Americans in southern France in August 1944... the 2nd Armored Division of Leclerc was sent over to... northern France, - in the words of one senior American general it was, 'the only French division which could be made 100% white'... Even if it was not at de Gaulle's instigation, it doesn't seem he particularly objected to this white-washing of the last stages of the Free French epic... The French were quick to forget that it was thanks to their colonial soldiers that they had any claim to have re-entered the war in 1944 as a great power."

Reception

Critical response
Days of Glory has an approval rating of 83% on review aggregator website Rotten Tomatoes, based on 86 reviews, and an average rating of 7.23/10. The website's critical consensus states, "Days of Glory is a powerful historical epic that pays homage to a valiant group of soldiers whose sacrifices have largely been forgotten". It also has a score of 82 out of 100 on Metacritic, based on 25 critics, indicating "universal acclaim".

Awards
Jamel Debbouze, Samy Naceri, Roschdy Zem, Sami Bouajila and Bernard Blancan won the Prix d'interprétation masculine at the 2006 Cannes Film Festival.

The film was nominated for the Academy Award for Best Foreign Language Film, but lost to The Lives of Others.

See also 
 3rd Algerian Infantry Division (France)
 Goumier
 Marocchinate
 Tirailleur

References

External links 
 
Official Days of Glory website (English)
More4 News report on the impact of Days of Glory

Belgian drama films
2000s war drama films
French war drama films
Moroccan drama films
2006 films
2000s Arabic-language films
Films set in Algeria
Films set in France
Films set in Italy
Algerian drama films
2000s French-language films
Abbey of Monte Cassino
Films about race and ethnicity
Films about racism
Operation Dragoon
Italian Campaign of World War II films
Western Front of World War II films
World War II films based on actual events
Films directed by Rachid Bouchareb
Films set in the French colonial empire
Battle of Monte Cassino
Films set in 1943
Films set in 1944
2006 drama films
2006 multilingual films
Algerian multilingual films
Belgian multilingual films
French multilingual films
Moroccan multilingual films
2000s French films
Films about immigration to France